Mississippi Highway 321 (MS 321) is a state highway consisting of two segments, one connecting Webb to Brazil in Tallahatchie County, the other in Quitman County in and around Lambert. It is a two-lane road for its entire length.

Route description
The two-lane state maintained highway heads north eventually paralleling the Tallahatchie River. The road is otherwise surrounded by agricultural fields. In the unincoporated community of Brazil, state maintenance ends before the road, continuing north as Brazil Quitman County Road, crosses Buzzard Bayou.

The northern segment of MS 321, completely maintained by Quitman County and the town of Lambert, begins at the intersection of Anderson Road and Schieleville Road. The intersection is located near the former Camp B of the Mississippi State Penitentiary, now mostly the O'Keefe Wildlife Management Area. The road heads due north paralleling a railroad and traveling through farmland before the road enters the town of Lambert. In the town, MS 321 carries the name 6th Street and passes by houses and churches. MS 321 ends at an intersection with MS 322 in Lambert.

Major intersections

References

External links

321
Transportation in Tallahatchie County, Mississippi
Transportation in Quitman County, Mississippi